The history of the Arkansas Army National Guard and the Cold War involves several statewide re-organizations that occurred as a result of the evolving structure of United States Army Divisions and Brigades. In 1959 the state re-organized and restationed units in response to the Army's adoption of the Pentomic Division, the structure which was designed to counter the Soviet threat in eastern Europe. Several Arkansas National Guard units were mobilized in 1960 as part of the Berlin Crisis. In 1963 the state reorganized again as the administration of President John F. Kennedy focused on "Flexible Response" and divisions reorganized to meet the challenged of numerous small wars such as the war in Vietnam. In 1967 the 39th Infantry Division was reorganized as the 39th Infantry Brigade (Separate) as a result of a plan to reduce the total number of National Guard Divisions nationwide. The state would eventually gain a new headquarters, the State Area Command in order to provide a higher headquarters for several units which were not assigned to either the 142nd Field Artillery Brigade or the 39th Infantry Brigade (Separate).

Reorganization of 1959
In 1959, the 39th Division was reorganized, along with all other National Guard divisions, in accordance with the new Pentomic Division Concept. This concept attempted to provide a new divisional structure to fight on the atomic battlefield. The reorganization resulted in the end of the Regiment as a tactical unit. Traditionally, regiments were the basic branch element, especially for the infantry, and their long histories had produced deep traditions considered essential to unit esprit de corps. The new divisional structure, replacing infantry regiments with anonymous battle groups, threatened to destroy all of these traditions. Secretary of the Army Wilber M. Brucker settled the question on 24 January 1957 when he approved the Combat Arms Regimental System. Although regiments (armored cavalry notwithstanding) would no longer exist as tactical units, certain distinguished regiments were to become "parent" organizations for the combat arms. Under the new concept, the Department of the Army assumed control of regimental headquarters – the repository for a unit's lineage, honors, and traditions – and used elements of the regiments to organize battle groups, battalions, squadrons, companies, batteries, and troops, which shared in the history and honors of their parent units. In place of the Regiment or Brigade, the new Pentomic Infantry Division fielded five Battle Groups, each containing 1,356 soldiers.

The 153rd Infantry was reorganized 1 June 1959 as a parent regiment under the Combat Arms Regimental System, to consist of the 1st, and 2nd, Battle Groups, elements of the 39th Infantry Division. The 445th Field Artillery Battalion, Arkansas National Guard, was re-designated as the 1st Battalion, 206th Artillery, and was organized as a composite battalion with one battery of 105 mm towed howitzers and one battery of 155 mm towed howitzers. The 437th Field Artillery Battalion, Arkansas National Guard, was re-designated as the 2nd Battalion, 206th Artillery and was organized as a composite battalion with one battery of 105 mm towed howitzers and one battery of 155 mm towed howitzers. A new battalion was created in the Arkansas National Guard from existing units, 3rd Battalion, 206th Artillery was a composite unit with one 8-inch howitzer battery and one MGR-1 Honest John rocket battery. The 206th Tank Battalion, Arkansas Army National Guard, was reorganized to become the 1st Medium Tank Battalion, 206th Armor Regiment.
This reorganization required a large scale restationing of units within the state:

Berlin Crisis
In 1961, during a period of increased tension between the Soviet Union and the United States, certain Arkansas National Guard units were authorized additional training as part of a Mobilization plan from the National Guard Bureau. Eventually seven Arkansas National Guard units would be mobilized for a period of up to 12 months under Presidential Executive Order 10957. Units were mobilized at homestations and reported to their designated mobilization station in October 1961. Most units remained on Active Duty until August 1962.

Reorganization of 1963
By 1963 the Army again changed the basic design for an Infantry Division. The Battle Groups of the Pentomic Division had proved to be unwieldy, and it was felt that their span of control was not sufficient to handle all of the various units and troops assigned to their command. The army reverted to the infantry battalion as the basic building block and provided for additional command and control by providing a brigade headquarters. The 1st and 2nd Brigade, 39th Division were allocated to the Louisiana National Guard, while the 3rd Brigade was allocated to the Arkansas National Guard. The 153rd Infantry was reorganized to consist of the 1st, 2nd, and 3rd Battalions. The 1st Battalion, 206th Field Artillery was deactivated and the 3rd Battalion, 142nd Field Artillery was added to the 39th Division Artillery. The 3rd Battalion, 142nd Field Artillery had previously been under the command and control of the 142nd Field Artillery Group. The 3rd Battalion, 206th Field Artillery was reduced to one Honest John Rocket Battery, Battery A. The 206th Armor was expanded to consist of the 1st and 2nd Battalion, 206th Armor Regiment. These changes, which were implemented on 1 May 1963, cause another massive restationing of units around the state:

Reorganization of 1967

During the 1960s, the Department of Defense continued to scrutinize the reserve forces. It questioned the number of divisions and brigades, as well as the redundancy of maintaining two reserve components, the National Guard and the Army Reserve. In 1967, Secretary of Defense Robert McNamara decided that 15 combat divisions in the Army National Guard were unnecessary. He cut the number to eight divisions (one mechanized infantry, two armored, and five infantry), but increased the number of brigades from seven to 18 (one airborne, one armored, two mechanized infantry, and 14 infantry). The loss of the divisions did not set well with the states. Their objections included the inadequate maneuver element mix for those that remained and the end to the practice of rotating divisional commands among the states that supported them. Under the proposal, the remaining division commanders were to reside in the state of the division base. No reduction, however, in total Army National Guard strength was to take place, which convinced the governors to accept the plan. The states reorganized their forces accordingly between 1 December 1967 and 1 May 1968.

On 2 November 1967, the Arkansas portion of the 39th Division was reorganized and redesignated as the 39th Infantry Brigade. This change and significant changes in the 142nd Artillery Group (Loss of 3rd, 4th and 5th Battalions) resulted in a massive restationing within the state as follows:

1967 was the last whole sale reorganization of the Arkansas National Guard with virtually every unit being reorganized and restationed. Prior to 1967, reorganization and restationing occurred at the state level every few years (1946, 1959, 1964) After 1967 reorganizations and restationing occur much more often but involved fewer units on a yearly basis. This article will only refer to reorganizations after 1967 that affect a brigade or battalion headquarters.

Creation of the State Area Command (STARC)

In 1983, National Guard Bureau, in Memorandum, NGB-ARO-0 207-02, Organizational Authority 27–83, authorized the creation of the State Area Command which incorporated the State Headquarters Detachment, the Command and Control Headquarters and the Camp Robinson Training Site.

References

External links
AR National Guard
AR Air National Guard
AR Army National Guard
The Arkansas National Guard Museum
Bibliography of Arkansas Army National Guard History compiled by the United States Army Center of Military History

Arkansas National Guard
Military units and formations in Arkansas
20th-century history of the United States Army